Colm Cassidy (born 11 March 1978, in Kilcormac, County Offaly, Ireland) is an Irish sportsperson.  He plays hurling with his local club Kilcormac–Killoughey and was a member of the Offaly senior inter-county team from 1997 until 2005.

References

1978 births
Living people
Kilcormac-Killoughey hurlers
Offaly inter-county hurlers